Brian Simmons is a British sound engineer. He was nominated for an Academy Award in the category Best Sound for the film Braveheart. He has worked on more than 100 films since 1966.

Selected filmography
 Braveheart (1995)

References

External links

Year of birth missing (living people)
Living people
British audio engineers
Best Sound BAFTA Award winners